The Bokhara Trumpeter is a breed of fancy pigeon developed over many years of selective breeding. Bokhara Trumpeters, along with other varieties of domesticated pigeons, are all descendants from the rock pigeon (Columba livia).
The breed is known for its long muffed (feathered) feet and double crest.

One of the most popular breeds of Trumpeter in the U.S., the Bokhara Trumpeter is most noticeably characterized by its lengthy full muffs (feathers on the feet) and double crest which completely obscures the bird's eyes and gives it a look reminiscent of the Old English Sheepdog. The trumpeting breeds of pigeon are so named because of their unique vocalizations which sound vaguely like low laughter.

Wendell Levi describes this trumpeting vocalization in his book The Pigeon.

See also 
Arabian Trumpeter
List of pigeon breeds

References 

Pigeon breeds